Where Was Spring? is a British television sketch comedy programme, which was first aired by the BBC in 1969–70 over six episodes.

The cast consisted of Eleanor Bron and John Fortune, two stalwarts of the British satire scene in the 1960s. The show consisted of a series of two-handed sketches performed by Bron and Fortune, mostly playing married or romantic couples though often not seen romantically.

The sketches were performed in a television studio setting which reinforced the sophistication of the scripts. There were also animated sequences supplied by Klaus Voormann, designer of the cover for the Beatles' Revolver album. These were accompanied by songs specially commissioned from Ray Davies of the Kinks. One of these, Where Did My Spring Go?, echoed the series title.

One other distinctive feature of the show's style were stylised photographs of both Bron and Fortune shown between sketches where the couple are dressed as Graeco-Roman Gods (Jupiter/Venus), perhaps illustrative of the perfection or imperfection of classic male-female relationships.

Recordings of the show are believed to have been wiped by the BBC as part of an economy measure.

Many of the sketches were reproduced in the book Is Your Marriage Really Necessary? by Bron and Fortune (hardcover with illustrating photographs, Oct 1972).

External links
 

BBC television sketch shows
1969 television specials